Aleksandr (Sasha) Anttilainen (born 19 December 1986) is a retired Soviet Union-born Finnish football player.

Career
Anttilainen formerly played for KooTeePee, JIPPO and Dinaburg. He has also played in Zenit St. Petersburg academy team.

Personal
Anttilainen moved to Joensuu, Finland with his family at the age of four. His parents are Russians of Finnish descent.

References

External links
 

1986 births
Living people
Footballers from Saint Petersburg
Finnish footballers
Finnish expatriate footballers
Russian emigrants to Finland
Dinaburg FC players
IFK Mariehamn players
Veikkausliiga players
JIPPO players
Kotkan Työväen Palloilijat players
Association football forwards